Mahmud Hasan Deobandi, popularly known as Shaykh al-Hind, was the first student of Darul Uloom Deoband, and one of three major students of its founder Muhammad Qasim Nanautavi. He presided the foundation ceremony of Jamia Millia Islamia at Aligarh in 1920. He wrote a translation of Quran in Urdu language which has been regarded as one of the most authentic South Asian translation of Quran.

Ebrahim Moosa, while commenting on the students of Mahmud Hasan Deobandi, says:

List of students 
The following is a list of the students of Mahmud Hasan Deobandi.

Bibliography

References

Deobandi-related lists
Sunni Muslim scholars of Islam
Darul Uloom Deoband alumni
Academic staff of Darul Uloom Deoband